The Tyndale Bible (TYN) generally refers to the body of biblical translations by William Tyndale into Early Modern English, made . Tyndale's Bible is credited with being the first Bible translation in the English language to work directly from Hebrew and Greek texts, although it relied heavily upon the Latin Vulgate. Furthermore, it was the first English biblical translation that was mass-produced as a result of new advances in the art of printing.

The term 'Tyndale's Bible' is not strictly correct, because Tyndale never published a complete English language Bible; instead, a completely translated Bible was completed by Myles Coverdale, who supplemented Tyndale's translations with his own to produce the first complete printed Bible in English in 1535. Before his execution, Tyndale had translated the New Testament, the Pentateuch, and the historical books of the Old Testament. Of the Old Testament books, the Pentateuch, Book of Jonah, and a revised version of the Book of Genesis were published during Tyndale's lifetime. His other Old Testament works were first used in the creation of the Matthew Bible and also greatly influenced subsequent English translations of the Bible.

History
The chain of events that led to the creation of Tyndale's New Testament possibly began in 1522, when Tyndale acquired a copy of the German New Testament. Tyndale began a translation into English using a Greek text compiled by Erasmus from several manuscripts older than the Latin Vulgate of Jerome, the only translation authorized by the Roman Catholic Church.

Tyndale made his purpose known to Bishop of London Cuthbert Tunstall but was refused permission to produce this "heretical" text. Thwarted in England, Tyndale moved to the continent. A partial edition was put into print in 1525 in Cologne of which there is only one fragment left, in the British Library. But before the work could be completed, Tyndale was betrayed to the authorities and forced to flee to Worms, where the first complete edition of his New Testament was published by Peter Schöffer the Younger in 1526, of which there are only 3 extant copies left. These can be found in the collections of St Paul's Cathedral, London, the British Library, and the Württembergische Landesbibliothek in Stuttgart. After his death in 1536, Tyndale's works were revised and reprinted numerous times and are reflected in more modern versions of the Bible, such as the King James Version.

Tyndale's translation of the Pentateuch was published at Antwerp by Merten de Keyser in 1530. His English version of the Book of Jonah was published the following year. This was followed by his revised version of the Book of Genesis in 1534. Tyndale translated additional Old Testament books including Joshua, Judges, First and Second Samuel, First and Second Kings and First and Second Chronicles, but they were not published and have not survived in their original forms. When Tyndale was executed, these works came to be in the possession of one of his associates, John Rogers. These translations were influential in the creation of the Matthew Bible which was published in 1537.

Tyndale used numerous sources when carrying out his translations of both the New and Old Testaments. When translating the New Testament, he referred to the third edition (1522) of Erasmus's Greek New Testament, often referred to as the Received Text. Tyndale also used Erasmus's Latin New Testament, as well as Luther's German version and the Vulgate. Scholars believe that Tyndale stayed away from using Wycliffe's Bible as a source because he did not want his English to reflect that which was used prior to the Renaissance. The sources Tyndale used for his translation of the Pentateuch however are not known for sure. Scholars believe that Tyndale used either the Hebrew Pentateuch or the Polyglot Bible and may have referred to the Septuagint. It is suspected that his other Old Testament works were translated directly from a copy of the Hebrew Bible. He also made use of Greek and Hebrew grammars.

Reaction of the Catholic Church and execution
Tyndale's translations were condemned in England by Catholic authorities, where his work was banned and copies burned. Catholic officials, prominently Thomas More, charged that he had purposely mistranslated the ancient texts in order to promote anti-clericalism and heretical views. In particular they cited the terms "church", "priest", "do penance" and "charity", which became in the Tyndale translation "congregation", "senior" (changed to "elder" in the revised edition of 1534), "repent" and "love", challenging key doctrines of the Roman Catholic Church.

Betrayed to church officials in 1536, he was defrocked in an elaborate public ceremony and turned over to the civil authorities to be strangled to death and burned at the stake. His last words are said to have been, "Lord! Open the King of England's eyes."

Challenges to Catholic doctrine
Tyndale's translation of the Bible had notes critical of the Roman Catholic Church. The Catholic Church had long proclaimed that the only true Church was the Catholic Church.

The word church in Catholic teaching could only be used of the Catholic Church, and there was no other organized religion in England at that time.

Some radical reformers preached that the true church was the "invisible" church, that the church is wherever true Christians meet together to preach the word of God. To these reformers, the Catholic Church was unnecessary, and its very existence proved that it was in fact not the "true" Church.

When Tyndale translated the Greek word  as congregation, he was thereby undermining the entire structure of the Catholic Church.

Many of the reform movements believed in the authority of scripture alone. To them it dictated how a "true" church should be organized and administered. By changing the translation from church to congregation Tyndale was providing ammunition for the beliefs of the reformers. Their belief that the church was not a visible systematized institution but a body defined by believers, however organized, who held a specifically Protestant understanding of the Gospel and salvation was now to be found directly in Tyndale's translation of Scripture.

Tyndale's use of the word congregation conflicted with the Catholic Church's doctrine that the lay members and the clergy were two separate classes within the Church, and the Catholic teaching of the Sacrament of Ordination. If the true church is defined as a congregation, the common believers, then the Catholic Church's claim that the clergy were of a consecrated order different than the average Christian and that they had different functions within the Church no longer held sway.

Tyndale's translation of the Greek word  to mean elder instead of priest also challenged the doctrines of the Catholic Church.

In particular, it undermined the Catholic Mass and its nature as a sacrifice. The role of the priest in the Catholic Church was to offer the sacrifice of Christ's body and blood in the ritual of the Mass, to bless, to conduct other religious ceremonies, to read and explain the scripture to the people, and to administer the other sacraments. In these ways they are different from the common believers.

In many reform movements a group of elders would lead the church and take the place of the Catholic priests. These elders were not a separate class from the common believers; in fact, they were usually selected from amongst them. Many reformers believed in the idea of the priesthood of all believers, which meant that every Christian was in fact a priest and had, for example, the right to read and interpret scripture. Tyndale's translation challenged the claim of scriptural basis for Catholic clerical authority.

Catholic doctrine was also challenged by Tyndale's translation of the Greek  as repent instead of do penance. This translation conflicted with the Catholic Sacrament of Confession.

Tyndale's translation of scripture backed up the views of reformers like Luther who had taken issue with the Catholic practice of sacramental penance. Tyndale believed that it was through faith alone that a person was saved. Christ had, by the giving of the Holy Spirit, given the power to forgive sins to his disciples in John 20:20-23.

Tyndale's position on Christian salvation differed from the views of the Catholic Church, which followed the belief that salvation was granted to those who lived according to Catholic doctrine and thus participated in the Church's seven Sacraments. Tyndale's translation challenged the belief that a person had to do penance for their sins to be forgiven by God. According to Tyndale's New Testament translation and other Protestant reformers, a believer could repent with a sincere heart, and God would forgive.

Tyndale's translation of the Bible challenged the Catholic Church in many other ways. For example, Tyndale's translation of the Bible into a vernacular language made it available to the common English-speaking person. Tyndale wanted everyone to have access to scripture and gave the common people the ability to read it for themselves but with a decidedly Protestant orientation in the choice of words used and in its annotations, which were suffused with Tyndale's Protestant beliefs. 

The greatest challenge that Tyndale's Bible caused the Catholic Church is best summed up by Tyndale, when he gave one of his primary reasons for translating the Bible: to "cause a boy that driveth the plough to know more scripture than the clergy of the day", many of whom were poorly educated. By this, Tyndale sought to undermine the Catholic Church's authority regarding the access to and interpretation of scripture, which he saw as detrimental. To Tyndale, a Roman Catholic priesthood was not needed as an intermediary between a person and God.

Legacy
Tyndale's Bible laid the foundations for many of the English Bibles which followed his. His work made up a significant portion of the Great Bible of 1539, which was the first authorized version of the English Bible. The Tyndale Bible also played a key role in spreading Reformation ideas to England which had been reluctant to embrace the movement. By including many of Martin Luther's commentaries in his works, Tyndale also allowed the people of England direct access to the words and ideas of Luther, whose works had been banned in England.

Perhaps the Tyndale Bible's greatest impact is that it heavily influenced and contributed to the creation of the King James Version, which is one of the most popular and widely used Bibles in the world today.

It has been suggested that around 90% of the King James Version (or at least of the parts translated by Tyndale) is from Tyndale's works, with as much as one third of the text being word for word Tyndale.

Many of the popular phrases and Bible verses that people quote today are in the language of Tyndale. An example of this is Matthew 5:9, "Blessed are the peacemakers."

The importance of the Tyndale Bible in shaping and influencing the English language has been mentioned. According to one writer, Tyndale is "the man who more than Shakespeare even or Bunyan has moulded and enriched our language."

When Tyndale embarked on his Old Testament translation, he realised that the anachronism of ester could not be sustained; and so coined the neologism, passover; which later Bible versions adopted, and substituted for ester in the New Testament as well.

Its remnant is seen as Easter once in the King James Version in Acts 12:4 and twice in the Bishops' Bible, John 11:55 as well as Acts 12:4.

See also 
 Geneva Bible
 Young's Literal Translation

Notes

References

Sources

Further reading

External links

 Searchable by phrase or chapter/verse reference.

1525 books
16th-century Christian texts
Bible smuggling
Bible translations into English
Early printed Bibles
History of Christianity in the United Kingdom
History of the Church of England
Tudor England